The 2010 ICC World Cricket League Africa Region Division Two was a cricket tournament held in Benoni, Gauteng, South Africa, took place between 23 April and 29 April 2010. It gave six African Associate and Affiliate members of the International Cricket Council experience of international one-day cricket and formed part of the global World Cricket League structure.

Zambia was promoted to 2010 ICC World Cricket League Division Eight.

Teams

There are six teams participating in the tournament. These teams are non-test member nations of the African Cricket Association. The teams are:

Squads

Group stage

Points Table

Fixtures

References

International cricket competitions in 2010
2010, 2
International cricket competitions in South Africa